The 2019 TCR Eastern Europe Trophy (also called 2019 TCR Eastern Europe Trophy powered by ESET for sponsorship reasons) was the first season of the TCR Eastern Europe Trophy. The season began on 27 April at the Hungaroring and ended on 13 October at the Autodromo Nazionale Monza.

Teams and drivers

Calendar and results
The calendar was released on 12 December 2018, with four rounds being held in conjunction with TCR Europe Touring Car Series. After the series was incorporated into the ESET V4 Cup as a standalone class, an amended calendar was published on 19 March 2019 with four of the six race calendar now forming part of the ESET V4 Cup calendar.

Drivers' standings 

† – Drivers did not finish the race, but were classified as they completed over 75% of the race distance.

Teams' standings 

† – Drivers did not finish the race, but were classified as they completed over 75% of the race distance.

References

External links 

 

TCR Eastern Europe Trophy
Eastern Europe Trophy